Montelupo can refer to:
Montelupo Albese, Province of Cuneo, Piedmont, Italy
Montelupo Fiorentino, Province of Florence, Tuscany, Italy
Raffaello da Montelupo - Italian sculptor
Baccio da Montelupo - Italian painter